Atractocarpus stipularis, commonly known as the green plum, is a flowering plant in the coffee family. The specific epithet alludes to its large stipules.

Description
Atractocarpus stipularis is a small, rounded, sparsely branched tree growing to 3–12 m in height. The smooth, ovate leaves are 12–30 cm long and 8–24 cm wide. The axillary, cymose inflorescences bear fragrant white flowers; males with 20 or more, females with 2 or 3. The yellow-green fruits are 3.2–3.4 cm long. The flowering season is from early November to late February.

Distribution and habitat
Atractocarpus stipularis is endemic to Australia’s subtropical Lord Howe Island in the Tasman Sea, 600 km east of the New South Wales mainland. It is widespread in sheltered sites at all elevations on the island.

References

External links
Flora of Australia online

stipularis
Endemic flora of Lord Howe Island
Plants described in 1869
Gentianales of Australia
Taxa named by Ferdinand von Mueller
Taxa named by Christopher Francis Puttock